John A. Chinnock (March 23, 1850 – September 27, 1937) was a Republican member of the Wisconsin State Assembly.

Biography
Chinnock was born on March 23, 1850, in Trumbull County, Ohio. The following year, he moved to Troy, St. Croix County, Wisconsin. He would later own two farms there before moving to Hudson, Wisconsin in 1906. Chinnock died in Hudson on September 27, 1937.

Political career
Chinnock was a member of the Assembly during the 1909, 1913 and 1917 sessions. Additionally, he was Chairman (similar to Mayor) of Troy and Chairman of the county board of supervisors of St. Croix County, Wisconsin.

His brother, George W. Chinnock, was also Chairman of Troy and a member of the Assembly.

References

People from Trumbull County, Ohio
People from Hudson, Wisconsin
Republican Party members of the Wisconsin State Assembly
Mayors of places in Wisconsin
County supervisors in Wisconsin
Farmers from Wisconsin
1850 births
1937 deaths
Burials in Wisconsin
People from St. Croix County, Wisconsin